Pachydactylus kladaroderma, also known as the thin-skinned gecko, fragile thick-toed gecko, or thin-skinned thick-toed gecko, is a member of the family Gekkonidae, also known as the typical geckos, found in South Africa.

Etymology 
The name "kladaroderma" is derived from the Greek "kladaros" which means "easily broken," and "derma" which means "skin." This is in reference to the fragile skin of the species.

Description 
Pachydactylus kladaroderma is differentiated from other members of the genus Pachydactylus by a low number of granules (3-6) bordering the mentals, an ear opening that resembles a slit, a 79% incidence of the superlabial entering the nostrils, the infralabials adjacent the mental (5-13,) and an overall dull brown coloring.

Distribution 
Known only from South Africa in the Cape Fold Mountains which surround the Little Karoo and the southern escarpment.

References 

kladaroderma
Geckos of Africa
Reptiles of South Africa
Reptiles described in 1996
Taxa named by William Roy Branch